Novaya Bryan (Shene Bereen) is a rural locality (a selo) in Zaigrayevsky District, Republic of Buryatia, Russia. The population was 4,643 as of 2010. There are 61 streets.

Geography 
Novaya Bryan is located 16 km south of Zaigrayevo (the district's administrative centre) by road. Chelutay (3 km) is the nearest rural locality.

References 

Rural localities in Zaigrayevsky District